Carmen Beauchamp Ciparick (born January 1, 1942) is a judge who served as associate judge on the New York Court of Appeals, the highest court in the state of New York, from 1994 through 2012, when she reached mandatory retirement age. As of June 2015, she has returned to the practice of law.

Early life and education
Judge Ciparick is the daughter of two migrants from Puerto Rico and grew up in Washington Heights. She is a 1963 graduate of Hunter College and a 1967 graduate of St. John's University School of Law.  
The Board of Trustees of the City University of New York has authorized Hunter College to award her an honorary Doctor of Laws at commencement exercises scheduled for January 24, 2013.

Legal career
Following law school and passing the bar, Ciparick worked for the Legal Aid Society. In 1978, she was appointed Judge of the New York City Criminal Court. She was elected as a justice of New York Supreme Court in 1982.

Judge Ciparick was appointed to the New York Court of Appeals by Governor Mario Cuomo in 1994. She was reappointed to the Court by Governor Eliot Spitzer in 2007. Upon reaching the mandatory retirement age, Ciparick retired on December 31, 2012.

In the well-known Court of Appeals case of Hernandez v. Robles, the court held, by a 4-2 majority, that the state constitution did not require the recognition of same-sex marriage. Chief Judge Judith Kaye wrote a strongly-worded dissent that Ciparick joined.

As of June 2015, she had returned to the practice of law, and was working at the notable law firm of Greenberg Traurig.

See also
List of Hispanic/Latino American jurists
List of first women lawyers and judges in New York

References

External links

 Hon. Carmen Beauchamp Ciparick
 Judge Carmen Beauchamp Ciparick: A Glimpse into the Senior Associate Judge's Judicial Philosophy Through Her Dissents
 Biography at the Greenberg Traurig law firm website

Judges of the New York Court of Appeals
New York (state) lawyers
American jurists
Hispanic and Latino American judges
American people of Puerto Rican descent
Hunter College alumni
St. John's University School of Law alumni
American women judges
Living people
Lawyers from New York City
1942 births
20th-century American women judges
20th-century American judges
21st-century American women judges
21st-century American judges
20th-century American women lawyers
20th-century American lawyers